Great Basin may refer to:

Places
Great Artesian Basin (Australia), a source of inland freshwater 
Great Basin (Maine), a drainage basin in Piscataquis County, Maine
Great Basin (western United States & Mexico), the largest North American endorheic watershed
Geographic areas associated with the Great Basin in western North America include:
Great Basin Divide, the encompassing continental divide that demarcates the Great Basin from the Pacific watershed
Great Basin Desert, a biologically defined desert
Great Basin National Park, a protected area in White Pine County, Nevada
Great Basin section, the physiographic region much smaller than the Great Basin but which extends into the Pacific watershed
Indigenous peoples of the Great Basin area, the cultural range of historic indigenous people much larger than the Great Basin
Ecological areas of the Great Basin:
Great Basin Floristic Province, an area that contains similar flora
Great Basin montane forest, a montane forest ecoregion defined by the World Wildlife Fund
Great Basin shrub steppe, a sagebrush steppe WWF ecoregion
Great Basin Highway, U.S. Route 93 in Nevada

Fauna and flora
 Pinus longaeva (Great Basin Bristlecone Pine)
 Great Basin pocket mouse
 Great Basin rattlesnake (disambiguation)
 Great Basin spadefoot
 Great Basin wildrye

Other
Journal of California and Great Basin Anthropology (Great Basin Anthropology), a topic of a regional journal published by the Malki Museum Press
Great Basin Center for Geothermal Energy, a research organization of the University of Nevada
Great Basin College, a state college at Elko, Nevada